Therese Soukup (born 8 July 2003) is a Seychellois swimmer. She competed in the women's 50 metre backstroke event at the 2018 FINA World Swimming Championships (25 m), in Hangzhou, China.

References

External links
 
 
 Therese Soukup at Eurosport

2003 births
Living people
People from Greater Victoria, Seychelles
Seychellois female swimmers
Female backstroke swimmers
Seychellois people of French descent
21st-century Seychellois people
Swimmers at the 2018 Commonwealth Games
Swimmers at the 2022 Commonwealth Games
Commonwealth Games competitors for Seychelles